Dale O. Thomas (February 26, 1923 in Marion, Iowa – March 4, 2004) was the head coach of the Oregon State wrestling team at Oregon State University from 1957 to 1990, and is a National Wrestling Hall of Fame member. He competed in the men's Greco-Roman light heavyweight at the 1956 Summer Olympics.

He died of kidney and liver failure due to complications from primary sclerosing cholangitis at the age of 81.

College
Thomas won nine national titles in collegiate freestyle and Greco-Roman wrestling during his college career, including the 1943 and 1947 NAAU Championship at 175 lbs.  He wrestled for the historic 1947 Cornell College team, coached by Paul Scott, that won both the NCAA and NAAU championships

Coaching
Thomas was head coach for the Beavers from 1957 to 1990, earning 22 conference titles and having coached 10 individual NCAA champions, 116 conference champions, and 60 All Americans.  His coaching dual meet record is 616–168–13, the 616 wins being an NCAA record for most dual meet wins in a coaching career.  He led the beavers to finish in the NCAA top 10 on 14 occasions.  He was also named NCAA Coach of the Year twice (1961 and 1970), and Pac-10 Coach of the Year four times.

Other accomplishments
Brought the NCAA championships to the West Coast for the first time in 1961, with Oregon State serving as the host school
Served as a wrestling referee in the 1960 and 1964 Summer Olympics.
Elected to the Cornell College of Iowa Sports Hall of Fame in 1970
Elected to the National Wrestling Hall of Fame in 1980
Elected to the State of Iowa Hall of Fame in 1982
Elected to the Oregon State University Sports Hall of Fame in 1992
Elected to the Oregon Sports Hall of Fame
Elected to the Helms Foundation Hall of Fame
Elected to the Iowa Wrestling Hall of Fame
Winningest college coach of all time (616 wins)
Featured in the March 6th 1989 issue of Sports  Illustrated Faces In The Crowd

Notes
 Dale Thomas Memorial Service Scheduled for 1 p.m. Sunday

References

External links
Oregon State Wrestling History
National Wrestling Hall of Fame profile

1923 births
2004 deaths
American male sport wrestlers
American wrestling coaches
Oregon State Beavers wrestling coaches
People from Marion, Iowa
Olympic wrestlers of the United States
Wrestlers at the 1956 Summer Olympics